A list of horror films released in 1962.

Notes

References 

 
 

Lists of horror films by year